Edinburgh North and Leith was a constituency of the Scottish Parliament (Holyrood). It elected one Member of the Scottish Parliament (MSP) by the plurality (first past the post) method of election. Also, however, it was one of nine constituencies in the Lothians electoral region, which elects seven additional members, in addition to nine constituency MSPs, to produce a form of proportional representation for the region as a whole.

For the Scottish Parliament election, 2011, the constituency was largely replaced by Edinburgh Northern and Leith.

The Scottish Parliament and UK Westminster constituency originally held the same boundaries, however, after the redrawing of the UK constituency boundaries they no longer share the same boundaries though they still mostly share the same rough outline.

Electoral region 
See also Lothians (Scottish Parliament electoral region)

The other eight constituencies of the Lothians region were Edinburgh Central, Edinburgh East and Musselburgh, Edinburgh Pentlands, Edinburgh South, Edinburgh West, Linlithgow, Livingston and Midlothian.

The region covered the City of Edinburgh council area, the West Lothian council area, part of the Midlothian council area, and part of the East Lothian council area.

Constituency boundaries 
The Edinburgh North and Leith constituency was created at the same time as the Scottish Parliament, in 1999, with the same name and boundaries as an existing Westminster constituency. In 2005, however, Scottish House of Commons constituencies were mostly replaced with new constituencies.

Council area 
The Holyrood constituency covered a northern portion of the City of Edinburgh council area. The rest of the city area was covered by five other constituencies, all also in the Lothians electoral region: Edinburgh East and Musselburgh, Edinburgh Central, Edinburgh South, Edinburgh Pentlands, Edinburgh West.

Edinburgh North and Leith had boundaries with the Edinburgh East and Musselburgh constituency, the Edinburgh Central constituency and the Edinburgh West constituency.

The Edinburgh East and Musselburgh constituency also covered the Musselburgh portion of the East Lothian council area. The rest of the East Lothian area was covered by the East Lothian constituency, which was in the South of Scotland electoral region.

Wards 
Edinburgh North and Leith included the wards of Broughton, Calton, Granton, Harbour, Lorne, New Town, Newhaven, Stockbridge, Trinity, and part of the Pilton ward, which is split with the Edinburgh West constituency. The wards were created in 1999, at the same time as the constituency, and was replaced with new wards in 2007, without change to constituency boundaries.

Constituency profile 

Edinburgh North and Leith was an urban constituency. It included Granton, Leith, New Town, Newhaven, Stockbridge, Trinity and a part of the Pilton area.

Member of the Scottish Parliament

Election results

Footnotes

See also
 Politics of Edinburgh
 Members of the Scottish Parliament, 2003-2007

North and Leith (Scottish Parliament constituency)
Scottish Parliament constituencies and regions 1999–2011
1999 establishments in Scotland
Constituencies established in 1999
2011 disestablishments in Scotland
Constituencies disestablished in 2011
Leith